PEGNet was founded in 2005 as a joint initiative of the Kiel Institute for the World Economy, Germany's (Federal Ministry for Economic Cooperation and Development), its implementing agencies Deutsche Gesellschaft für Internationale Zusammenarbeit and KfW Entwicklungsbank as well as the universities of Göttingen and Frankfurt. It was created to bring policymaking in line with research findings and practical realities for development.

The founding institutions were later joined by other research institutions, individual researchers and practitioners from all over the world. Notable examples include the London-based Overseas Development Institute (Overseas Development Institute), the Paris-based think tank DIAL (Développement, Institutions et Ajustement à Long terme), and the Southern Africa Labour and Development Research Unit in Cape Town.

As of 2011, PEGNet had more than 100 institutional and individual members.

References

Economics organizations
2005 establishments in Germany
Organizations established in 2005